The Other Two is an American comedy television series created by Chris Kelly and Sarah Schneider. The story follows two floundering millennial siblings who must grapple with their 13-year-old brother's overnight fame. The series premiered on Comedy Central on January 24, 2019, and was renewed for a second season shortly after, on February 11, 2019. The second season premiered on August 26, 2021, on HBO Max. In September 2021, the series was renewed for a third season, which will premiere on May 4, 2023 on HBO Max.

Premise
A gay aspiring actor, Cary (Drew Tarver), and his sister Brooke (Heléne Yorke), a former professional dancer, try to find their place in the world while wrestling with their feelings about their 13-year-old brother Chase's sudden rise to internet fame.

Cast and characters

Main cast
 Heléne Yorke as Brooke Dubek, Cary and Chase's older sister and a former professional dancer, who wants to figure out her career path
 Drew Tarver as Cary Dubek, Brooke's younger brother, Chase's older brother, and an aspiring actor, who struggles to find roles
 Case Walker as Chase Dubek / ChaseDreams, Cary and Brooke's younger brother, who is thrust into stardom after a viral internet video
 Ken Marino as Streeter Peters, ChaseDreams' newly hired manager. Streeter was named after Streeter Seidell, a CollegeHumor alumnus and SNL writer with whom series creator Sarah Schneider had worked.
 Molly Shannon as Pat Dubek, the three siblings' Hollywood-ready mother (season 2; recurring season 1)

Recurring
 Josh Segarra as Lance Arroyo, Brooke's upbeat, sweet, and seemingly simple-minded ex who specializes in novelty footwear
 Brandon Scott Jones as Curtis Paltrow, Cary's co-worker and confidant
 Wanda Sykes as Shuli Kucerac, an executive from ChaseDreams' record label
 Andy Ridings as Matt, Cary's roommate, who swears he is straight but makes moves on Cary (season 1)
 Richard Kind as Skip Schamplin, Cary's agent who also has multiple odd jobs (season 1)
 Daniel K. Isaac as Jeremy Delongpre, a teacher and love interest for Cary (season 1)
 Gideon Glick as Jess, Cary's love interest (season 2)

Guest stars
 Beck Bennett as Jeff, Brooke's one-time lover and flight attendant (season 1)
 Chris Cafero as Tad, Brooke's one-time date and ChaseDreams super-fan (season 1)
Josie Totah as Elijah, a student in episode 5 who asks Cary to dance (season 1)
Alison Rich as Melanie, a producer on Pat's show (season 2)
 Kathie Lee Gifford, Hoda Kotb, Erin Lim, Mario Lopez, Tinsley Mortimer, Michael Che, Andy Cohen, Patrick Wilson, Debi Mazar, Jordana Brewster, Alessia Cara, Bowen Yang, and Justin Bartha also appear as themselves.

Episodes

Season 1 (2019)

Season 2 (2021)

Production

Development

A few months prior to being named co-head writers for Saturday Night Lives 42nd season, Chris Kelly and Sarah Schneider spent a week in early 2016 developing the premise of The Other Two. They wanted the show to depict the introspection and self-doubt that twenty-somethings face, while incorporating elements of pop culture. Kelly said they wanted to include depictions of the characters' sex lives. Speaking to Vulture, Schneider said they intentionally wrote the character of Chase to be kind and innocent because it would subvert expectations of the story.

The pilot was sold to Comedy Central in late 2016. Schneider and Kelly hired Charlie Gruet, who was the director of photography of the television series High Maintenance.  In October 2017, The Other Two received a full series order. The series was produced through executive producer Lorne Michaels' entertainment studio, Broadway Video. The first season began streaming on HBO Max in 2021, where the second season streams exclusively, making the series a "Max Original". The second season premiered on August 26, 2021, on HBO Max with a two-episode release. On September 24, 2021, HBO Max renewed the series for a third season.

Casting
In October 2017, it was announced that Drew Tarver, Heléne Yorke, Case Walker, Ken Marino, and Molly Shannon had joined the cast. Kelly and Schneider discovered Walker on social media: Walker was popular on the platform Musical.ly and had over 400,000 followers on Instagram. Tarver was brought in based on his comedic work at Upright Citizens Brigade Theatre, while Yorke was cast after Kelly and Schneider had seen her work on High Maintenance. It was announced in February 2020 that Gideon Glick would have a recurring role in the second season as Cary's new love interest, Jess. Shannon was promoted to the main cast in season two.

Filming
Filming for the second season initially began in early 2020 but abruptly halted in March due to the COVID-19 pandemic. Filming for the second season resumed on February 22, 2021, in New York and Los Angeles and concluded on May 9.

Reception
The first season has an approval rating of 94% based on 36 reviews, with an average rating of 8.52 out of 10, on the review aggregation website Rotten Tomatoes. The website's critical consensus reads: "With game leads and a wickedly witty sense of humor, The Other Two skewers and celebrates pop culture with equal aplomb." Metacritic assigned the series a weighted average score of 79 out of 100 based on 16 critics, indicating "generally favorable reviews". The second season has an approval rating of 96% based on 24 reviews, with an average rating of 8.50 out of 10, on the review aggregation website Rotten Tomatoes. The website's critical consensus reads: "More mature, but still hilarious, The Other Two's superb second season solidifies its place as one of TVs best comedies."

Accolades

Notes

References

External links

2010s American LGBT-related comedy television series
2020s American LGBT-related comedy television series
2019 American television series debuts
Comedy Central original programming
HBO Max original programming
English-language television shows
Gay-related television shows
Television series about actors
Television series about families
Television series about show business
Television series about social media
Television series about siblings
Television series by Broadway Video